Sergejs Šakurovs (born 25 April 1958) is a Latvian equestrian. He competed in two events at the 1988 Summer Olympics.

References

1958 births
Living people
Latvian male equestrians
Olympic equestrians of the Soviet Union
Equestrians at the 1988 Summer Olympics
Sportspeople from Riga
20th-century Latvian people
21st-century Latvian people